Suzanne Doppelt (born 1956) is a contemporary French writer and photographer, living in Paris. Suzanne Doppelt studied philosophy and teaches photography at the European Graduate School in Saas-Fee, Switzerland.

Suzanne Doppelt has exhibited at several venues, including New York University, Deutsches Haus, Centre Culturel Français, Damas; Ecole des Beaux Arts de Nîmes; Pavillon des Arts, Paris; Centre Georges Pompidou, Paris; and Galerie Pennings in Eindhoven, the Netherlands.

Publications 
 Kub Or, with Pierre Alferi, P.O.L, 1994
 Mange, éditions Snapshot, 1995
 Just from Cynthia, Alberto Sorbelli, CD rom, Centre Georges Pompidou, 1996
 L'hypothèse du château, éditions Snapshot, 1997
 36 chandelles, Cronopio/AFAA,1998
 Dans la reproduction en 2 parties égales, with Anne Portugal, P.O.L, 1999
 13 superstitions, with Manuela Morgaine, éditions Créaphis, 1999
 Raptus, éditions de l'Attente, 2000
 Totem, P.O.L, 2002
 1990–2004 : Revues Antigone, Vis à Vis international, Revue de littérature générale, Vacarme, Parallax, Rhinocéros
 La 4 ème des plaies vole, Inventaire/Invention éditions, 2004
 Quelque chose cloche, P.O.L, 2004 :
 Le pré est vénéneux. P.O.L., 2007
 Lazy Suzie. P.O.L., November 2009
 Humorous poems by Pierre Alferi, accompanied by Doppelts' photographs, modelled on the packaging of the French bouillon " Bouillons Kub ".

Personal Exhibitions
 1994 : Cultural centre, Cerisy-la-Salle
 1995 : Galerie Snapshot, Amiens
 1996 : University of Amiens
 1999 : Centre méditerranéen de la photographie, Bastia
 2000 : Galerie Pennings, Hollande, University of Lyon
 2001 : Institut français de Naples, Le Pavillon, Pantin
 2002 : FNAC, Paris and provinces
 2003 : Château de Châteaudun
 2004 : galerie Eof, Paris
 2004 : Abbey of Royaumont
 2006 : New York University, Deutsches Haus

Collective Exhibitions
 1996 : Centre Georges Pompidou
 1998 : Galerie du Lézard, Colmar
 1999 : Galerie Pierre Brullé, Paris, Centre photographique de Lectoure
 2000 : Galerie Brownstone, Paris
 2001 : Espace Saint-Jacques, St Quentin
 2003 : ST'ART, Strasbourg
 2005 : Pavillon des Arts, Paris

References

External links
 Suzanne Doppelt Faculty Profile at European Graduate School (Biography, bibliography and video lectures)
 Avital Ronell and Ulrich Baer. Hungry eye: The photography of Suzanne Doppelt. Artforum. May 2002

French photographers
French art critics
French women art critics
Academic staff of European Graduate School
Living people
1956 births
French women photographers